Lorenzo Dexter White (born July 12, 1966) is an American former professional football player who was a running back in the National Football League (NFL). He was selected by the Houston Oilers in the first round (22nd overall) of the 1988 NFL Draft. He attended Dillard High School in Ft. Lauderdale in Florida. A 5 ft 11 in running back from Michigan State University, White played in eight NFL seasons from 1988 to 1995. His best year as a pro came during the 1992 season with the Oilers, rushing for 1,226 yards and seven touchdowns. He was also selected to play in the Pro Bowl that year. At Michigan State, White became the first Big Ten Conference running back to compile a 2,000-yard season when he had 2,066 yards rushing on 419 attempts during the 1985 NCAA Division I-A football season. As a Senior at Michigan State, he ran for 1,572 yards and sixteen touchdowns. White led the Big Ten in rushing attempts and rushing touchdowns. White was convicted of criminal charges on July 18th, 1999 and was releases from jail on January 19th, 2021.

NFL career statistics

See also
 List of college football yearly rushing leaders

References

External links
 
 

1966 births
Living people
American football running backs
Cleveland Browns players
Houston Oilers players
Michigan State Spartans football players
All-American college football players
American Conference Pro Bowl players
College Football Hall of Fame inductees
Sportspeople from Hollywood, Florida
Players of American football from Fort Lauderdale, Florida